Burton N. Pugach (April 20, 1927 – December 24, 2020) was a New York City-based lawyer who spent 14 years in prison for hiring men to throw lye in the face of his former girlfriend (and future wife) Linda Eleanor Riss (February 23, 1937 – January 22, 2013).

Biography 

In 1959, Pugach began a courtship of Linda Riss, a 21-year-old woman from the East Bronx. Upon discovering that Pugach had a wife and daughter, Riss broke off their relationship. Pugach then threatened to kill or hurt Riss if she left him, saying "If I can't have you, no one else will have you, and when I get through with you no one else will want you." Riss reported the threat to the New York Police Department to no avail. Upon hearing of her engagement to Larry Schwartz, Pugach hired three assailants to attack Riss. The assailants threw lye in Riss's face, leaving her blind in one eye, nearly blind in the other, and permanently scarred. Pugach was convicted of the crime and spent 14 years in prison, during which time he continually wrote to Riss. He was subsequently disbarred, due to his felony conviction.

After he was released from prison in 1974, Pugach and Riss resumed their relationship and married soon thereafter. In 1976 they co-wrote a book, A Very Different Love Story. In 1997 Pugach was once again accused of threatening a woman with whom he was having an affair. Riss appeared at his trial as a character witness for him. Riss died of heart failure on January 22, 2013, at the age of 75. In 2007 Dan Klores produced a documentary film  Crazy Love about Pugach and Riss. Pugach died on December 24, 2020, in Queens.

References

Bibliography 

 Farnsworth, Ward and Grady, Mark F. Torts: Cases & Questions. Aspen Publishers. 2004. 
 Stainback, Berry. A Very Different Love Story: Burt and Linda Pugach's Intimate Account of Their Triumph Over Tragedy. Morrow, 1976.

External links 

 Website for Crazy Love (movie)
 Crazy Love IMDb
 For Worse and for Better: Documenting an Obsession Article from The New York Times
 The Observer Life and Style: Meet the Pugachs, Article from The Guardian
 Homegrown "Crazy Love" Hits Theaters, Article from The Queens Chronicle
 Live From Studio 1A: Burt and Linda's "Crazy Love", Article from Today.com
 Blind to His Faults, Article from The Washington Post
  Linda's Fear Story Rocks Trial, Article from the Daily News
  Pugach Gets 15 Yrs. in Lye Attack on Girl, Article from the Daily News
 Riss v. New York A lawsuit filed by Linda Riss against the New York City Police Department for failing to protect her
  Follow-Up on the News: Love Story, Article From The New York Times
 Follow-Up on the News: Love Story Part II, Article From The New York Times
 Lye in Face Ends in Pair's Marriage, Article From The Lawson Constitution
  Not Just Another Love Story, Article From The Michigan Daily
  A Very Different Love Story Article From The New York Times
 Love After the Lye, People Magazine, February 14, 1977

1927 births
2020 deaths
Brooklyn Law School alumni
Disbarred American lawyers
New York (state) lawyers
People from Queens, New York